The London and South Western Railway C14 class was a class of ten 2-2-0 tank locomotives intended to work push–pull trains on lightly used lines in 1907. The S14 class was an 0-4-0 version of the same basic design. Both classes proved to be underpowered in this role and many examples were sold as light shunters during the First World War. Three C14 remained with the LSWR and were rebuilt as 0-4-0Ts. They lasted until the late 1950s.

History

C14 class
During the first few years of the twentieth century, the London and South Western Railway became concerned about losses incurred on several branch and short-distance passenger services, and began to experiment with the use of steam-powered railmotors. The resulting units proved to be under-powered during the summer months when traffic was higher, and also inflexible, as the power unit was permanently connected to the coach. As an alternative Dugald Drummond designed a class of small 2-2-0 tank locomotives, based on the railmotor power units, which could be coupled to one or more carriages to cater for different levels of load. These were specifically equipped for Push–pull trains working. As built, the outside cylinders were situated between the leading and driving wheels.

The C14 class were tried out on a number of services during 1907. They were found to be more flexible than the railmotors but suffered from the same lack of power, as a result no further examples were built and the existing examples were gradually transferred to light shunting tasks or else were put into store.

S14 class
Drummond persevered with a 0-4-0 S14 version of the design, with the cylinders moved forward in front of the coupled wheels, larger boiler, cylinders and wheels. However, only two of these were ever built in 1910 before the order was cancelled. In 1913, Robert Urie ordered that four examples of the C14 class should be rebuilt as [[0-4-0 tanks and the remainder withdrawn as they became in need of heavy repairs. Two examples were rebuilt in 1913, but the onset of the First World War brought an end to this programme.

World War I
In 1916, the War Office bought seven members of the C14 class (including one of the rebuilds) for use in various munitions facilities and dockyards. The two members of the S14 class were likewise sold to the Ministry of Munitions in 1917. After the war, these were sold for scrap, as stationary boilers or else exported.

Post-war
The last two 2-2-0  examples of the three locomotives remaining with LSWR were rebuilt in 1922 and 1923. The three survivors worked as dock shunters, or on departmental (non-revenue earning) duties under the Southern Railway and British Railways and were withdrawn between 1957 and 1959.

Summary table

References

C14
2-2-0T locomotives
0-4-0T locomotives
Railway locomotives introduced in 1906
Railway locomotives introduced in 1910
Standard gauge steam locomotives of Great Britain